René Lévesque was a Canadian television miniseries that aired on CBC Television in 2006.  It stars Emmanuel Bilodeau as former-Quebec premier René Lévesque.

Plot and production
The series dramatized Lévesque as a journalist who eventually becomes the leader of the Parti Québécois.  A journalist, Bilodeau, plays Lévesque, and it has been noted that Bilodeau had met the real Lévesque before the former-premier's death.  The series was viewed as "part of CBC's high-impact programming strategy."

Reception
One newspaper said Bilodeau had a "remarkable" similarity to Lévesque in appearance; however, another critic complained of "meandering looks at dubious 'icons' like separatist René Lévesque."  The series was considered a ratings flop since it drew only 131,000 viewers.  It was thus seen as being among a few disappointments for the CBC in 2006, along with the documentary Hockey: A People's History and the television series What It's Like Being Alone.

See also
René Lévesque (TV series)
Trudeau (film)

References

External links
René Lévesque at the Internet Movie Database

2006 Canadian television series debuts
2006 Canadian television series endings
2000s Canadian drama television series
Canadian biographical films
2000s Canadian television miniseries
CBC Television original programming
René Lévesque
English-language television shows
French-language television shows
Canadian political drama television series